Silvio Liotta (9 October 1935 – 15 September 2018) was an Italian politician.

A native of Cremona, Liotta was secretary-general of the Sicilian Regional Assembly prior to his election to the Chamber of Deputies in 1994, affiliated with Forza Italia. He left FI for Italian Renewal, from which he was expelled in 1998 because he voted in favor of a no confidence motion ending the Prodi I Cabinet. Liotta subsequently joined the Union of the Centre. Liotta stepped down as deputy in 2006. He died on 15 September 2018 in Palermo.

References

1935 births
2018 deaths
Politicians from Cremona
Forza Italia politicians
Italian Renewal politicians
Union of the Centre (2002) politicians
Deputies of Legislature XII of Italy
Deputies of Legislature XIV of Italy